

Gmina Koziegłowy is an urban-rural gmina (administrative district) in Myszków County, Silesian Voivodeship, in southern Poland.

Villages
Apart from the town of Koziegłowy, Gmina Koziegłowy contains the villages and settlements of Cynków, Gliniana Góra, Gniazdów, Koclin, Koziegłówki, Krusin, Lgota Górna, Lgota-Mokrzesz, Lgota-Nadwarcie, Markowice, Miłość, Mysłów, Mzyki, Nowa Kuźnica, Oczko, Osiek, Pińczyce, Postęp, Pustkowie Lgockie, Rosochacz, Rzeniszów, Siedlec Duży, Stara Huta, Winowno, Wojsławice and Zabijak.

Neighbouring gminas
Gmina Koziegłowy is bordered by the town of Myszków and by the gminas of Kamienica Polska, Ożarowice, Poraj, Siewierz and Woźniki.

Twin towns – sister cities

Gmina Koziegłowy is twinned with:
 Vatra Dornei, Romania

References

Kozieglowy
Myszków County